Acanthocalycium klimpelianum is a species of Acanthocalycium from Argentina.

References

External links
 
 

klimpelianum
Flora of Argentina